= Nikos Eleutheriadis =

Cypriot footballer (born 1937)

Personal information
- Date of birth: 31 August 1937 (age 89)
- Place of birth: Nicosia, Cyprus
- Position: Goalkeeper

International career
| Years | Team | Apps | (Gls) |
| 1960–1966 | Cyprus | 9 | (0) |

Nikos Eleutheriadis (born 31 August 1937) is a Cypriot footballer. He played in nine matches for the Cyprus national football team from 1960 to 1966.
